Philip Bailey is the seventh studio album by American R&B and soul singer Philip Bailey, issued in 1994 by Zoo Entertainment.

Overview
Artists such as Brian McKnight, Chuckii Booker, PM Dawn and Nadirah Ali guest on the album.

The single, "Here with Me", peaked at No. 33 on the Billboard Adult R&B Airplay chart.

Critical reception

David Montero of the Orange County Register said "Bailey has crafted an album that will appeal to his old fans from his days with Maurice White and company, and he may attract some new ones with songs that stand above much of what is played on urban contemporary radio. The cover is misleading because he looks like a young, up-and-coming hip-hop homeboy a la the members of Another Bad Creation. But Bailey has some solid tracks that are catchy and well-produced." Montero added "In a sense this is a theme album, as every track deals with romance _ hardly a new topic in pop. But Bailey manages to avoid the cliches and has made an album that is as enjoyable to listen to as some of his early stuff from his Earth, Wind and Fire days." Lynn Dean Ford of the Indianapolis Star gave a three out of four stars rating noting "He's back again with a self-titled album that may not spawn as big a hit as his 1984 Easy Lover duet with Phil Collins, but it's good nonetheless. You'll find some very engaging pop-soul here, much of it produced by singer-songwriters Chuckii Booker and Brian McKnight. Bailey's falsetto doesn't soar as it once did on EW&F standards like Reasons and ' Write a Song For You, but his vocals seem more expressive when he isn't pushing to reach those stratospheric notes. And he can still weave some soul into a song, particularly on Love Me Tonight and Just Like Summer.
Michael Eric Dyson of Rolling Stone stated "In the hands of a lesser talent, some of these songs might barely seep through the cracks, less than memorable fare conjured up to please a legend. But Bailey's grace and magic, apparent throughout, redeem the recordings." Dyson added "What's remarkable above all on this album is that Bailey's brilliant falsetto retains its sweet purity, even as he employs more of a pleasing baritone than he has revealed before. While that alone doesn't compensate for some of the just-OK stuff he has to work with, it delights nonetheless." With a 3 out of 4 stars rating Derek Ali of the Dayton Daily News scribed "There's "something" for just about every musical taste among the 12-tracks, while a unity in sound is maintained throughout the album." Ali added "If you listen closely, there are hints of every step of Bailey's musicial life on the album. The music is pure."
Carol Cooper of Newsday wrote Philip Bailey takes another step forward for neo-traditionalism in black music, with the sensitive gentleman-crooner triumphantly ascendant."

Track listing
"Stay Right Here" (Philip Bailey, Chuckii Booker) - 5:07
"Just Like Summer" (P. Bailey, Robert Brookins) - 5:10
"Here with Me" (Brian McKnight) - 4:22
"A Diamond Just Like You"  (P. Bailey, Attrell Cordes) - 4:53
"I'm Ready" (B. McKnight) - 4:43
"Love Me Tonight" (P. Bailey, R. Brookins, Wayman Tisdale)- 4:58
"I Won't Open My Arm" (P. Bailey, A. Cordes) - 3:48
"Crazy Things You Do for Love" (B. McKnight) - 4:23
"Live It Up" (P. Bailey) - 4:47
"Yours" (P. Bailey, Roxanne Seeman, Chuck Wild) - 4:02
"Call Me" (B. McKnight) - 4:30
"Something's Missing" (P. Bailey) - 4:16

Japan release

The release of Philip Bailey in Japan included the bonus track "People And Places", a duet between Philip Bailey and Dee Dee Bridgewater that was a single from the 1994 French film La Vengeance d'une Blonde album soundtrack.

Personnel 
 Philip Bailey – lead vocals, backing vocals (1, 2, 3, 8-12), vocal arrangements (1, 9, 12)
 Chuckii Booker – all instruments (1, 9, 12), vocal arrangements (1, 9, 12), backing vocals (9)
 Robert Brookins – keyboards (2, 3, 5, 6, 8, 11), drums (3, 5, 6, 8, 11), arrangements (6)
 Brian McKnight – all instruments (3, 5, 8, 11), programming (3, 8, 11), backing vocals (3, 8, 11), vocal arrangements (3, 8, 11)
 Michael McKnight – programming (3, 8, 11)
 Oji Pierce – keyboards (4, 7)
 Rex Rideout – keyboards (4, 7)
 Michael Fossenkemper – programming (4, 7)
 Chuck Wild – keyboards (10)
 Frank Gambale – guitar solo (2)
 Cameron Grieder – guitar (4)
 Jerry Barnes – bass (4)
 Wayman Tisdale – bass (6), arrangements (6)
 Etienne Lytel – bass (7)
 John Paris – drums (2)
 Demetric Collins – drum programming (10)
 Jeff Haynes – percussion (4)
 Diane Lesser – English horn (4)
 Scott Mayo – saxophone solo (5)
 David Boruff – alto saxophone (10)
 Bill Meyers – string arrangements (2)
 Max Ellen – horn and string arrangements (4), concertmaster (4)
 Joseph Gianono – orchestration (4)
 Eddie del Barrio – string arrangements (10)
 Valerie Davis – backing vocals (1, 12)
 Sheldon Reynolds – backing vocals (1, 12)
 Alex Brown – backing vocals (2)
 Karen Bernod – backing vocals (4, 7)
 Robbie Jenkins – backing vocals (4, 7), BGV co-arrangements (7)
 Prince Be – BGV arrangements (7)
 Nadirah Ali – lead and backing vocals (10)

Strings (Tracks 2, 4 & 10)
 Eugene Moye and Fred Zlotkin – cello
 Alfred Brown and Mitsue Takayama – viola 
 Abe Appleman, Charles Libove, Gene Orloff, John Pintavalle, Matthew Raimondi, Elliot Rosoff, Richard Sortomme, Marti Sweet and Marilyn Wright – violin

Production 
 Chuckii Booker – producer (1, 9, 12)
 Robert Brookins – producer (2, 6), additional producer (3, 5, 8, 11), remixing engineer (3, 5, 8, 11), engineer (6)
 John Paris – co-producer (2)
 Brian McKnight – producer (3, 5, 8, 11)
 P.M. Dawn – producers (4, 7)
 Wayman Tisdale – producer (6)
 Philip Bailey – producer (10)
 Roxanne Seeman – producer (10)
 James Mack – executive producer 
 Bill Preskill – executive producer 
 James Hunter – A&R 
 Guy DeFazio – engineer (1, 9, 12), assistant engineer (1, 9, 12)
 Anthony Jeffries – engineer (1, 9, 12), assistant engineer (1, 9, 12)
 Greg Burbidge – mixing (1, 9)
 Donnell Sullivan – engineer (2, 3, 6), mixing (2, 6, 10), remixing engineer (3, 5, 8, 11)
 Paul Clingberg – engineer (3, 5, 8, 11)
 Chris Wood – engineer (3, 5, 8, 11)
 Michael Fossenkemper – engineer (4, 7), mixing (4, 7)
 Troy Halderson – horn and string engineer (4)
 Chuck Wild – recording (10)
 Susan Becker – assistant engineer (1, 9, 12), mix assistant (1, 9, 11)
 Ray Silva – assistant engineer (1, 9, 12)
 Dominic Barbera – assistant engineer (4, 7)
 Scott Canto – assistant engineer (4, 7)
 Robert Friedrich – assistant horn and string engineer (4)
 Valicia Franklin – project coordinator 
 Lee Hammond – art direction 
 Nancy Ogami – design 
 Michael Halsband – photography

Charts

References

1994 albums
Philip Bailey albums
Zoo Entertainment (record label) albums